The Baylor–TCU football rivalry, also referred to as The Revivalry, is an American college football rivalry between the Baylor Bears and TCU Horned Frogs. The first game of the 118-game series was played in 1899, making the rivalry one of the oldest and most played in FBS college football.

History
Baylor was chartered in 1845 by The Republic of Texas and founded as a Baptist institution in the same year with its original location in Independence, Texas. Baylor permanently moved to Waco forty years later, in 1885. TCU was founded in 1873 as AddRan Male and Female College by brothers Addison and Randolph Clark, in Thorp Springs, Texas, and was later renamed AddRan Christian University and relocated to Waco in 1895. AddRan was renamed Texas Christian University in 1902 and finally relocated to Fort Worth in 1910 after a fire destroyed the school's main administration building in Waco.

First contested in 1899, and having been played 117 times, the rivalry is one of the oldest and most-played series in college football history. The two schools, which were once both located in Waco, Texas, are separated by only 90 miles.

Between 1899 and 1910, when both schools were located in Waco, the Bears and Horned Frogs frequently faced off multiple times per season. In the early years of the rivalry, TCU and Baylor did not play as conference foes. Like most schools of that era, Baylor was independent until becoming a founding member of the Southwest Conference (SWC) in 1915. TCU subsequently joined the SWC in 1923, after competing as an independent (1896–1913 and 1921–22). After TCU joined, Baylor and TCU played 69 times as SWC foes, until the SWC disbanded in 1995. After a 10-year hiatus, the universities renewed the rivalry in a non-conference series in 2006–2007 and 2010–2011. During this series, TCU competed in the Mountain West Conference. TCU joined Baylor in the Big 12 Conference in 2012, and the rivalry game is now played annually as part of the teams' regular season conference schedules.

The 2014 contest marked the first time in 110 meetings that both Baylor and TCU faced off as ranked teams (#5 Baylor hosted #9 TCU). In one of the wildest games of the season, the Bears won an offensive shootout 61–58, overcoming a 58–37 deficit in the 4th quarter. The loss effectively cost the Horned Frogs a chance at making the first ever College Football Playoff. Since Baylor lost to West Virginia the following week, they too were left out of the Playoff as they finished as Big 12 co-champions along with TCU. The committee chose Big Ten Champion Ohio State instead of Baylor or TCU. This prompted controversy as TCU was ranked #3 heading into conference championship weekend (and fell to #6 afterwards), although they did not play in a conference championship, as the Big 12 did not have one at the time and simply awarded the championship to the team with the best record in the conference. The 2015 contest again featured two ranked teams (#15 TCU hosted #7 Baylor).

Parity
The rivalry is one of the most unusual in college football, not only because it features two private Christian schools, but also because of its historic and recent parity. In 117 meetings, TCU leads the series 58–53–7. Since resumption of the rivalry in 2006, the series is led by TCU 10–4, and since TCU joined Baylor in the Big 12 in 2012, the Big 12 series record is held by TCU 7–3. Only the ACC rivalry between the Virginia Cavaliers and North Carolina Tar Heels,  SEC rivalry between the Georgia Bulldogs and Auburn Tigers, Big Ten rivalry between the Minnesota Golden Gophers and Wisconsin Badgers, and non-conference rivalry between the Kansas Jayhawks and Missouri Tigers are similarly competitive over 100+ meetings.

Game sites
The Bears have used several playing sites throughout the rivalry. No records are available to determine where Baylor hosted home games prior to 1902. From 1902 to 1925, Baylor hosted most of their home games at Carroll Field, an on-campus facility, and at Waco's old Cotton Palace, off campus. Baylor played all home games at the Cotton Palace from 1926–29 before returning to Carroll Field for all home games from 1930–35. The Bears moved off the main campus in 1936 to the newly built Waco Stadium, renamed Municipal Stadium in 1942. From 1950 through 2013, Baylor home games were played at Baylor Stadium, renamed Floyd Casey Stadium in 1989. Since 2014, Baylor home games have been played in McLane Stadium, adjacent to Baylor's campus and the Brazos River.

The Horned Frogs played their Fort Worth home games at Clark Field until 1930, when TCU opened the new Amon G. Carter Stadium.  Since the 1930 opening, Amon G. Carter Stadium was expanded and renovated on multiple occasions, the most recent of which cost approximately $164 M, was completely funded by private donors, and was completed in 2012.

Close games and shutouts
Football games between Baylor and TCU have been decided by 7 points or less 44 times, including 7 ties. 

Several of the Bears and Horned Frogs' meetings since the rivalry's annual renewal in 2010 have featured memorable, close contests. In 2011, Baylor notched a season-opening 50–48 win, with Robert Griffin III, leading a fourth-quarter Baylor drive to set up Aaron Jones' game-winning field goal over the Horned Frogs. In 2014, Baylor came back from a 21-point, fourth quarter deficit by scoring 24 unanswered points to win the game 61–58 with a last second Chris Callahan FG. The outcome of the 2014 matchup and TCU's fourth-quarter collapse was critical in knocking TCU out of the inaugural College Football Playoff; both Baylor and TCU would go on to compile 11–1 (8–1 Big 12) regular season records and ultimately neither team got a Playoff spot as the committee chose 12-1 (and eventual national champion) Ohio State instead. Many have speculated that neither team was chosen because they were co-champions and the Big 12 did not have an actual conference championship at the time (the Big 12 title was awarded to the team with the best conference record). In 2015, the rivalry game was played on Thanksgiving Friday night in Fort Worth, with temperatures in the 30s and pouring rain. After a lightning-delayed start, the high-power spread offenses managed only 14 points apiece in regulation, with TCU securing a 28–21 second-overtime victory with a fourth down stop. In 2019, Baylor outlasted TCU in triple overtime to remain unbeaten. In 2022, undefeated 10–0 TCU won a hard-fought game, 29–28, by lining up to kick a walk-off 40 yard field goal on a running clock.

There have been 36 shutouts in the series; the most recent of which was a 27–0 TCU win in 2007 in Fort Worth.

Homecoming
TCU holds the record as Baylor's most common opponent for its annual Homecoming game. The rivalry has been showcased as Baylor's Homecoming game 31 times, but TCU holds a 16–15 lead in these games. Baylor won the last of these Homecoming match-ups in 1995, 27–24.

Thanksgiving
In the early years of the series, Baylor and TCU played 8 times on Thanksgiving Day with Baylor earning a 6–2 advantage. Baylor won in 1901, 1907, 1908, 1909, 1915 and 1919. TCU won in 1904 and 1917. The rivalry has also been played as a Thanksgiving weekend game 9 other years with Baylor holding a 6–3 lead; Baylor winning in 1901, 1903, 1916, 1976, 1977 and 2013, and TCU winning in 1905, 2015, and 2017. The Baylor–TCU game was most recently featured as a Thanksgiving weekend game on November 24, 2017.

Other events
In 1971, TCU coach Jim Pittman collapsed and died on the sideline in Waco during the rivalry game, the only time in collegiate history that a coach died during a game.

Notable players and coaches
The rivalry has featured:
2 Recognized National Championships: 1935 TCU (Paul O. Williamson System) and 1938 TCU (AP Poll: Consensus #1)
5 College Football Hall of Fame Head Coaches: Baylor - Morley Jennings, Grant Teaff; TCU - Matty Bell, Dutch Meyer, Francis Schmidt
2 Heisman Trophy winners: Davey O'Brien for TCU in 1938 and Robert Griffin III for Baylor in 2011.
1 Maxwell Award winner: Davey O'Brien for TCU in 1938.
1 Davey O'Brien Award winner: Robert Griffin III for Baylor in 2011 and Max Duggan for TCU in 2022.
2x Sammy Baugh Trophy winner: Don Trull for Baylor in 1962 and 1963.
1 Manning Award winner: Robert Griffin III for Baylor in 2011.
1 Rimington Trophy winner: Jake Kirkpatrick for TCU in 2010.
3 Jim Thorpe Award winners: Thomas Everett for Baylor in 1986, Trevon Moehrig for TCU in 2020 and Tre'Vius Hodges-Tomlinson for TCU in 2022.
1 Lou Groza Award winner: Michael Reeder for TCU in 1995.
2x Ray Guy Award winner: Daniel Sepulveda for Baylor in 2004 and 2006.
2 Earl Campbell Tyler Rose Award winners: Bryce Petty for Baylor in 2013 and Trevone Boykin for TCU in 2014.
1 Fred Biletnikoff Award winner: Corey Coleman for Baylor in 2015.
1 Johnny Unitas Golden Arm Award winner: Max Duggan for TCU in 2022.

Other notable players that played in this rivalry:

Baylor - Mike Singletary, Hayden Fry, Larry Isbell, Bill Glass, Larry Elkins, Santana Dotson

TCU - Sammy Baugh, Bob Lilly, Andy Dalton, Jerry Hughes, Jim Swink, Ki Aldrich

Game results

See also 
 List of NCAA college football rivalry games
 List of most-played college football series in NCAA Division I

References

Baylor Bears football
TCU Horned Frogs football
College football rivalries in the United States
1899 establishments in Texas